The Libro de Alexandre is a medieval Spanish epic poem about Alexander the Great written between 1178 and c. 1250 in the mester de clerecía. It is largely based on the Alexandreis of Walter of Châtillon, but also contains many fantastical elements common to the Alexander romance. It consists of 2,675 stanzas of cuaderna vía and 10,700 lines. 

The Libro is preserved in two manuscripts, called P and O, neither of which appears to be an original. There are as well three fragments preserved in separate manuscripts. Manuscript O is the earlier, copied around 1300, and includes 2,510 stanzas of cuaderna vía and two epistles. It was once owned by the Duke of Osuna (whence O) and was known to Íñigo López de Mendoza, 1st Marquess of Santillana. P, from Paris, was copied in the fifteenth century and contains 2,639 stanzas. It is generally more reliable and together the two manuscripts make a coherent whole. R. S. Willis, Jr., produced an edition of both manuscripts where a page from O faces the corresponding page from P, with fragments noted at the bottom, so that one reading can readily be corrected by the other text. O is generally considered to be from eastern Castile, while P was copied in western Castile. The fragment G′ is named after Gutierre Díez de Gamés, who included stanzas from the first part of the Libro in his early fifteenth-century Victorial. 

The date of composition is uncertain. However, it must postdate 1178, the earliest year when Walter completed the Alexandreis, and predate 1250, the approximate date of the Poema de Fernán González, which it influences. Some scholars have fixed the date as between 1202 and 1207. Besides the Alexandreis, the author of the Libro claimed many sources. In his own words: el uno que leyemos, el otro que oyemos / de las mayores cosas Recabdo vos daremos ("the one that we read, the other that we hear / of the greatest things collected we give you"). These sources include the Historia de proeliis of Leo of Naples and several ancient authorities, including Leo's source, Quintus Curtius, Flavius Josephus, and the Pindarus Thebanus. The work of Isidore of Seville and the Old French Roman d'Alexandre were also consulted. 

Structurally the Libro is a chronological story of Alexander's life set between an introduction in six stanzas and a conclusion in seven. There are digressions and authorial displays of erudition, but the narrative, from birth to death, is logical and smooth. The problem of authorship is unresolved. It has been variously attributed to Juan Lorenzo de Astorga (sometimes thought to be merely a scribe), Alfonso X of Castile, and Gonzalo de Berceo.

Following is a sample text from the Libro, with translations in Modern Spanish and English. This fragment sums up the fall of Alexander because of his pride.

Notes

Further reading

Arnold, H. H. (1936). "Notes on the Versification of El Libro de Alexandre". Hispania, 19(2), 245–254. 
Berzunza, Julius (1927). "A Digression in the Libro de Alexandre: The Story of the Elephant". Romanic Review, 18, 238–245. 
Corfis, Ivy A. (1994). "Libro de Alexandre: Fantastic Didacticism". Hispanic Review, 62(4), 477–486. 
Davis, Gifford (1947). "The Debt of the Poema de Alfonso Onceno to the Libro de Alexandre". Hispanic Review, 15(4), 436–452. 
Deyermond, A. D. (1975). "The Lost Genre of Medieval Spanish Literature". Hispanic Review, 43(3), 231–259. 
Dutton, Brian (1960). "The Profession of Gonzalo de Berceo and the Paris Manuscript of the Lebro de Alexandre". Bulletin of Hispanic Studies, 37(3), 137–145. 
Espósito, Anthony P. (1994). "(Re)covering the Chiasmus: Restoring the Libro(s) de Alexandre". Hispanic Review, 62(3), 349–362. 
Fraker, Charles F. (1987) "Aetiologia in the Libro de Alexandre". Hispanic Review, 55(3), 277–299. 
Fraker, Charles F. (1988) "The Role of Rhetoric in the Construction of the Libro de Alexandre". Bulletin of Hispanic Studies, 65(4), 353–368. 
Gimeno Casalduero, Joaquín (1974). "Un nuevo estudio sobre el Libro de Alexandre". Romance Philology, 28(1), 76–91. 
Gumbrecht, Hans Ulrich and Helga Bennett (1974). "Literary Translation and its Social Conditioning in the Middle Ages: Four Spanish Romance Texts of the 13th Century". Yale French Studies, 51, Approaches to Medieval Romance, 205–222. 
Michael, Ian (1960). "Interpretation of the Libro de Alexandre: The Author's Attitude Towards His Hero's Death". Bulletin of Hispanic Studies, 37(4), 205–214. 
Michael, Ian (1961). "A Comparison of the Use of Epic Epithets in the Poema de Mio Cid and the Libro de Alexandre". Bulletin of Hispanic Studies, 38(1), 32–41. 
Michael, Ian (1967). "A Parallel between Chrétien's Erec and the Libro de Alexandre". The Modern Language Review, 62(4), 620–628. 
Nelson, Dana A. (1968). "El libro de Alexandre: A Reorientation". Studies in Philology, 65(5), 723–752.
Nelson, Dana A. (1972). "Syncopation in El Libro de Alexandre". Periodical of the Modern Language Association, 87(5), 1023–1038.
Pacual-Argente, Clara (2022), Memory, Media, and Empire in the Castilian Romances of Antiquity: Alexander’s Heirs, Leiden, Brill (The Medieval and Early Modern Iberian World, 83). ISBN 978-90-04-51226-9
Rico, Francisco (1985). "La clerecía del mester". Hispanic Review, 53(1), 1–23. 
Ware, Niall J. (1965). "The Date of Composition of the Libro de Alexandre: A Re-examination of Stanza 1799". Bulletin of Hispanic Studies, 42(4), 251–255. 
Ware, Niall J. (1967). "The Testimony of Classical Names in Support of Metrical Regularity in the Libro de Alexandre". Hispanic Review, 35, 211–226. 
Williamson, J. R. (1977). "Darius and the Spring Landscape: Theme and Structure in the Libro de Alexandre". Neophilologus, 61(4), 534–540. 
Willis, Raymond S. (1956/7). "Mester de clerecía: A Definition of the Libro de Alexandre". Romance Philology, 10, 212–224. 
Willis, Raymond S. (1974). "The Artistry and Enigmas of the Libro de Alexandre: A Review Article". Hispanic Review, 42(1), 33–42.

External links

 Edition of Francisco Marcos Marín, Libro de Alexandre
 Amaia Arizaleta, Hacia una bibliografía del Libro de Alexandre
 Enrique Celis Real, Análisis comparativo del Libro de Alexandre (estrofas 322-762) y la Ilíada de Homero.
 Marisa Martínez Pérsico, Fronteras del mundo, fronteras del saber y fronteras del relato en El libro de Alexandre

Alexander Romance
Medieval literature
Spanish literature
Medieval documents
13th-century books
13th century in Castile